Fortior Club de la Côte Ouest known as Fortior Mahajanga or simply Fortior CO is a Malagasy football club based in Mahajanga.

Achievements
THB Champions League: 2
1972, 1979

Coupe de Madagascar: 5
1974, 1975, 1976, 1977, 1985

Performance in CAF competitions
African Cup of Champions Clubs: 2 appearances
1973 – Second Round
1980 – Second Round

African Cup Winners' Cup: 4 appearances

1975 – Quarter-finals
1976 – Preliminary Round

1978 – First Round
1987 – Second Round

References

External links
Team profil – Goalzz.com

Football clubs in Madagascar